Bato station is a railway station located on the South Main Line in Camarines Sur, Philippines. It is still use for the Bicol Commuter.

Philippine National Railways stations
Railway stations in Camarines Sur